This is a list of public art in the London Borough of Bromley.

Beckenham

Bickley

Biggin Hill

Bromley

Chislehurst

Crystal Palace

Keston

Mottingham

Orpington

Penge

Petts Wood

St Mary Cray

Shortlands

West Wickham

References

External links
 

Bromley
Bromley
Tourist attractions in the London Borough of Bromley